Anchusa strigosa is a non-succulent species of herbaceous plants in the Boraginaceae family endemic to the Eastern Mediterranean regions, particularly, Greece, Turkey, Lebanon, Israel, Jordan, and Iran. It is known widely by its common names of strigose bugloss and prickly alkanet.

Description
Anchusa strigosa is a perennial herb, with a rosette of leaves at its base and an inflorescence stem that rises to a height of one meter or more. The leaves are rough as the tongue of a ruminate, from whence its Arabic designation (لسان الثور; lisān eth-thawr) and its Hebrew designation (לשון-פר; leshon-par) take their names. The plant grows lean, and is often scraggy, from whence the modern taxonomic name of the species (strigosa) takes its name. In winter the plant grows a large rosette of leaves, and in late spring a few inflorescence stems grow from the base of the plant. The petiole is nail-like (9 mm long) and has a narrow tube and a closed pharynx with bristly white scales. The flower of the Anchusa strigosa is blue. However, there is a white flower variety of the plant that is gradually displacing the blue variety.

The Italian bugloss is very similar to Anchusa strigosa in as far as its blue flower is concerned, but differs from Anchusa strigosa by its soft hairs which are not prickly. In taste, the cooked tender leaves of the Italian bugloss are preferable to the strigose bugloss, but from the flowers of both species can be made a sweet condiment. 

The roots of Anchusa (like those of Alkanna and Lithospermum) contain anchusin (or alkanet-red), a red-brown resinoid colouring matter. It is insoluble in water, but soluble in alcohol, chloroform and ether. The red-tinge was used in women's cosmetics as rouge to redden the cheeks.

Distribution and habitat
The plant is native to the Old World, namely, the Eastern Mediterranean basin and adjacent Western Asia, growing in heavy soils in semi-steppe shrub lands, shrub-steppes, and in Mediterranean woodlands. In Israel its principal habitat is the transition belt between the Mediterranean coastal region and the arid desert regions, growing along waysides in sandy and chalkstone habitats.

The flowers of the Anchusa strigosa blossom between March and May in Israel. In Ottoman Palestine, the flower's pollen was harvested by honey bees in the production of honey.

Uses
A reddish-brown saliva-like resinoid exudes from the roots of the plant when bruised, which, in some species, was formerly collected and used for medicinal purposes. Gustaf Dalman who conducted geographical and ethnographic research in Palestine in the early 20th-century heard the plant lisān eth-thōr described to him in the country as being an edible wild herb, and which he applied to Anchusa officinalis, saying that its young leaf growths of spring were collected by some of the indigenous Arab peoples of the land, who then boiled them to be eaten. After boiling, the leaves are finely chopped and sautéed in oil and garlic, and used as a meat garnish or as a viand with eggs. 

The Greek physician and botanist Dioscorides (c. 40–90 CE) mentions the medicinal properties of the genera Anchusa in his day, adding that "the ointment makers use the root for thickening ointments." Burns and skin lesions can be cured with an ointment prepared from crushed leaves of the plant with the addition of olive oil. The Jewish philosopher and physician, Maimonides (1138–1204 CE), recalls the genera Lingua Bovina ("ox-tongue") in his Guide to Good Health (Regimen Sanitatis), saying that it is "a proven light drug used in compound decoctions," after its leaves were dried, ground into a powder, and infused in hot water.

References

Further reading
 Galen, XI, pp. 811–813 (Blendings and Dynameis of Simple Drugs, VI. 1. 4: "The Four Άγχούσαι"); Pliny, Natural History, XXII, 48–49, 51–52; XXVII, 59; Hesychius, Lexicon, ed. Latte, vol. 1, p. 35 (pp. 924–924: άγχούσα)

External links

Flora of Israel Online, by Prof. Avinoam Danin
 Wild Flowers of Israel. Anchusa strigosa

strigosa
Flora of Israel
Flora of Lebanon
Flora of Jordan
Flora of Palestine (region)
Taxa named by Joseph Banks
Taxa named by Daniel Solander